The Lightweight Helmet (LWH), also known as the Lightweight Marine Corps Helmet or Lightweight Marine Helmet, is an armored helmet that is used by the United States Marine Corps and U.S. Navy. It is the U.S. Marine Corps' replacement for the PASGT combat helmet and is derived from the Modular Integrated Communications Helmet.

History

As it is nearly identical to untrained eyes in shape to the PASGT, outside the Marine Corps it is still called the Fritz helmet or K-pot (due to its resemblance to the German Stahlhelm). Though heavier than the United States Army's Advanced Combat Helmet, its larger size also offers more protection and is lighter than the PASGT.  Featuring a four-point retention strap system (compared to the two-point retention of the PASGT) and redesigned liner, it is considered more comfortable than the PASGT.

The LWH was designed in 2003 and entered service later that year. It completely replaced the PASGT in USMC service by 2009. The LWH was made by the Gentex Corporation and BAE Systems in five sizes. From 2007 onward, pads were installed in the helmet to improve comfort for wearers.

Whereas the PASGT helmet's shell is olive drab, the LWH's is coyote brown and can be fitted with cloth helmet covers, either originally made for the PASGT or more commonly those made for the LWH in desert and woodland MARPAT, as well as a mounting bracket on the front for any sort of night vision device, such as the AN/PVS-7 night vision goggle or AN/PVS-14 monocular night vision device (MNVD). Marines currently can be issued with a sling suspension or a pad suspension to fit the inside of the helmet to the head. A nape protection system adds ballistic protection to the rear of the head was also added as to reduce strain and improve comfort to the back of the neck.

Successor

The Marine Corps placed its first order for the Enhanced Combat Helmet in July 2013, and was fielded to deployed Marines by the end of 2013.  The ECH is planned to equip all deployed Marines, while the Lightweight Helmet will still be used for training and noncombat purposes. Beginning in 2021, a high cut ECH variant with attachment rails and a contour similar to the Ops-Core FAST helmet already in use by special operations forces was issued to Marines in combat arms units.

Users
 
 United States Marine Corps (and attached U.S. Navy personnel)
 United States Navy
 Seabees

See also
 Advanced Combat Helmet
 Enhanced Combat Helmet

References

External links

 Marine Corps Systems Command Page about the LWH
 World-War-Helmets.com - LWH Helmet (French)

2000s fashion
2010s fashion
Combat helmets of the United States
United States Marine Corps equipment
Military equipment introduced in the 2000s